Decree on the system of government of Russia (1918)
 Soviet Russia Constitution of 1918
 The act on the establishment of the All-Russian supreme power